Scotch cap may refer to:

 Tam o' Shanter (cap), a hat
 Rubus occidentalis, Black raspberry
 Scotch Cap Light, a lighthouse

See also 
 Scotch bonnet (disambiguation)